Lester Bowie (October 11, 1941 – November 8, 1999) was an American jazz trumpet player and composer. He was a member of the Association for the Advancement of Creative Musicians and co-founded the Art Ensemble of Chicago.

Biography
Born in the historic village of Bartonsville in Frederick County, Maryland, United States, Bowie grew up in St Louis, Missouri. At the age of five he started studying the trumpet with his father, a professional musician. He played with blues musicians such as Little Milton and Albert King, and rhythm and blues stars such as Solomon Burke, Joe Tex, and Rufus Thomas. In 1965, he became Fontella Bass's musical director and husband. He was a co-founder of Black Artists Group (BAG) in St Louis.

In 1966, he moved to Chicago, where he worked as a studio musician, and met Muhal Richard Abrams and Roscoe Mitchell and became a member of the AACM. In 1968, he founded the Art Ensemble of Chicago with Mitchell, Joseph Jarman, and Malachi Favors. He remained a member of this group for the rest of his life, and was also a member of Jack DeJohnette's New Directions quartet. He lived and worked in Jamaica and Nigeria, and played and recorded with Fela Kuti. Bowie's onstage appearance, in a white lab coat, with his goatee waxed into two points, was an important part of the Art Ensemble's stage show.

In 1984, he formed Lester Bowie's Brass Fantasy, a brass nonet in which Bowie demonstrated jazz's links to other forms of popular music, a decidedly more populist approach than that of the Art Ensemble. With this group he recorded songs previously associated with Whitney Houston, Michael Jackson, and Marilyn Manson, along with other material. His New York Organ Ensemble featured James Carter and Amina Claudine Myers. In the mid 1980s he was also part of the jazz supergroup The Leaders. Featuring tenor saxophonist Chico Freeman, alto saxophonist Arthur Blythe, drummer Famoudou Don Moye, pianist Kirk Lightsey, and bassist Cecil McBee. At this time, he was also playing the opening theme music for The Cosby Show.

Although seen as part of the avant-garde, Bowie embraced techniques from the whole history of jazz trumpet, filling his music with humorous smears, blats, growls, half-valve effects, and so on. His affinity for reggae and ska is exemplified by his composition "Ska Reggae Hi-Bop", which he performed with the Skatalites on their 1994 Hi-Bop Ska, and also with James Carter on Conversin' with the Elders. He also appeared on the 1994 Red Hot Organization's compilation album, Stolen Moments: Red Hot + Cool.  The album to raise awareness and funds in support of the AIDS epidemic in relation to the African-American community, was heralded as "Album of the Year" by Time.

In 1993, he played on the David Bowie album Black Tie White Noise, including the song "Looking for Lester", which was named after him. (Lester and David Bowie are also unrelated - David Bowie's birth name was David Jones.)

Bowie took an adventurous and humorous approach to music and criticized Wynton Marsalis for his conservative approach to jazz tradition. 

Bowie died of liver cancer in 1999 at his Clinton Hill, Brooklyn, New York house he shared with second wife Deborah for 20 years. The following year he was inducted into the Down Beat Jazz Hall of Fame. In 2001, the Art Ensemble of Chicago recorded Tribute to Lester. In 2020, Bowie was featured in a mural painted by Rafael Blanco in his hometown of Frederick, Maryland.

Discography

As leader

Lester Bowie's Brass Fantasy

Lester Bowie's New York Organ Ensemble

With the Art Ensemble of Chicago

With the Leaders

 Mudfoot (Black Hawk), 1986
 Out Here Like This (Black Saint), 1986
 Unforeseen Blessings (Black Saint), 1988
 Slipping and Sliding (Sound Hills), 1994

As sideman
With David Bowie
 Black Tie White Noise (Savage, 1993)
With James Carter
 Conversin' with the Elders  (Atlantic, 1995)
With Jack DeJohnette
 New Directions (ECM, 1978)
 New Directions in Europe (ECM, 1979)
 Zebra (MCA, 1989)
With Brigitte Fontaine
 Comme à la Radio (Saravah, 1971)
With Melvin Jackson
 Funky Skull (Limelight, 1969)
With Fela Kuti
 Stalemate (Afrodisia, 1977)
 No Agreement (Afrodisia, 1977)
 Sorrow Tears and Blood (Kalakuta Records, 1977)
 Fear not for man (Afrodisia, 1977)
With Frank Lowe
 Fresh (Freedom, 1975)
With Jimmy Lyons
 Free Jazz No. 1 (Concert Hall, 1969)
 Other Afternoons (BYG, 1970)
With Roscoe Mitchell
 Sound (Delmark, 1966)
With David Murray
 Live at the Lower Manhattan Ocean Club (India Navigation, 1978)
With Sunny Murray
 Sunshine (BYG, 1969)
 Homage to Africa (BYG, 1969)
With Charles Bobo Shaw
Under the Sun (Freedom, 1973)
 Streets of St. Louis (Moers Music, 1974)
With Archie Shepp
 Yasmina, a Black Woman (BYG, 1969)
 Blasé (BYG, 1969)
 Pitchin Can (America, 1970)
 Coral Rock (America, 1970)
With Alan Silva
 Seasons (BYG, 1971)
With Wadada Leo Smith
 Divine Love (ECM, 1979)
With others
 Funky Donkey Vol. 1 & 2 (Atavistic) (Luther Thomas & the Human Arts Ensemble)
 Under the Sun (Universal Justice) 1974 (Human Arts Ensemble)
 Funky Donkey 1977 (Circle) (Luther Thomas Creative Ensemble)
 Free to Dance (Black Saint), 1978 (Marcello Melis)
 6 x 1 = 10 Duos for a New Decade (Circle), 1980 (John Fischer)
 The Razor's Edge/Strangling Me With Your Love (Hannibal, 12"), 1982 (Defunkt)
 The Ritual (Sound Aspects), 1985 (Kahil El'Zabar)
 Meet Danny Wilson (Virgin), 1987 (Danny Wilson)
 Sacred Love (Sound Aspects), 1988 (Kahil El'Zabar)
 Avoid The Funk (Hannibal), 1988 (Defunkt)
 Environ Days (Konnex), 1991 (John Fischer)
 Cum Funky (Enemy), 1994 (Defunkt)
 Hi-Bop Ska, 1994 (Skatalites)
 Stolen Moments: Red Hot + Cool (Impulse!), 1994 (Various Artists) appears on one track with Digable Planets
 Bluesiana Hurricane (Shanachie), 1995 with Rufus Thomas, Bill Doggett, Chuck Rainey, Bobby Watson, Will Calhoun, and Sue Foley
 Buddy Bolden's Rag (Delmark), 1995 (Malachi Thompson & Africa Brass)
 Not Two (Biodro Records), 1995 (Miłość and Lester Bowie)
 No Ways Tired (Nonesuch), 1995 (Fontella Bass)
 Mac's Smokin' Section (McKenzie), 1996 (Mac Gollehon)
 Hello Friend: To Ennis with Love (Verve), 1997 (Bill Cosby)
 My Secret Life (Calliope), 1998 (Sonia Dada)
 Amore Pirata (Il Manifesto), 1998 (Lorenzo Gasperoni Mamud Band feat. Lester Bowie)
 Smokin' Live (McKenzie), 1999 (Mac Gollehon)
 G:MT – Greenwich Mean Time (Island Records), 1999 (Guy Sigsworth)
 Talkin' About Life And Death (Biodro Records), 1999 (Miłość and Lester Bowie)
 Test Pattern (Razor & Tie), 2004 (Sonia Dada)
 Hiroshima (Art Yard), 2007 (The Sun Ra All Stars Band)
 The Ancestors Are Amongst Us (Katalyst, recorded live at Jazzfestival Saafelden August 28, 1987 and released 2010) - with Kahil El'Zabar and the Ritual Trio

Notes

References

External links
Lester Bowie at the Art Ensemble of Chicago

African-American jazz musicians
American jazz trumpeters
American male trumpeters
American jazz composers
American male jazz composers
Avant-garde jazz trumpeters
Free funk trumpeters
Free jazz trumpeters
Jazz-pop trumpeters
Jazz-funk trumpeters
Post-bop trumpeters
Progressive big band musicians
1941 births
1999 deaths
Art Ensemble of Chicago members
Jazz musicians from Illinois
Musicians from Chicago
Musicians from St. Louis
People from Frederick, Maryland
Deaths from liver cancer
Deaths from cancer in New York (state)
Nessa Records artists
ECM Records artists
20th-century American composers
20th-century trumpeters
Jazz musicians from Maryland
Jazz musicians from Missouri
20th-century American male musicians
People from Fort Greene, Brooklyn
Human Arts Ensemble members
The Leaders members
Improvising Artists Records artists
20th-century jazz composers
Jazz musicians from New York (state)
20th-century African-American musicians